PDV, PdV or pdv may refer to:

Political parties
 Party of Reason (Partei der Vernunft), a libertarian party in Germany
 Party of the Venetians (Partito dei Veneti), a Venetist-separatist coalition of parties active in Veneto, Italy
 Venezuelan Democratic Party (Partido Democrático Venezolano), a Venezuelan party active in the 1940s

Other uses
 
 Peter de Villiers (born 1957), South African rugby union coach and former head coach of the country's national team
 PDV, a part of the second phase of the Indian Ballistic Missile  Defence Programme
 Planar Doppler velocimetry, a technique for measuring the velocity of a flow based on a Doppler shift
 Plovdiv Airport (International Air Transport Association code PDV), airport in Bulgaria
 Present discounted value, in finance or economics, the value of an expected income stream determined as of the date of valuation
 Phocine distemper virus, a virus of the genus Morbillivirus that is pathogenic mainly to sea mammals 
 Polydnavirus, a member of the family Polydnaviridae of insect viruses